David Neil Hempton  (born 1952) is a Northern Irish historian of evangelicalism, dean of Harvard Divinity School, and fellow of the Royal Historical Society.

Biography
Hempton was born on 19 February 1952, in Northern Ireland. He earned his Bachelor of Arts degree (1974) from the Queen's University Belfast and his Doctor of Philosophy degree (1977) from the University of St Andrews. Hempton began teaching at Queen's University in 1979, where he was professor of modern history and director of the school of history. He joined the faculty of Boston University in 1998, where he was professor of the history of Christianity, and in 2008 named "Outstanding Teacher of the Year" at the divinity school. In 2007, he was appointed as the first Alonzo L. McDonald Family Professor of Evangelical Theological Studies at Harvard Divinity School, and in 2012 it was announced he would succeed William A. Graham as dean of the school. In 2020 he was admitted as a member of the Royal Irish Academy.

Selected publications
Methodism and Politics in British Society, 1750–1850, winner of The Whitfield Prize (1984) 
The Religion of the People: Methodism and Popular Religion C. 1750–1900 (1996) 
Religion and Political Culture in Britain and Ireland: From the Glorious Revolution to the Decline of Empire (1996) 
Methodism: Empire of the Spirit, winner of the Jesse Lee Prize (2005) 
Evangelical Disenchantment: Nine Portraits of Faith and Doubt (2008) 
The Church in the Long Eighteenth Century, winner of the Albert C. Outler Prize (2011)

References

External links
Hempton's faculty page at Harvard Divinity School

Harvard Divinity School faculty
Fellows of the Royal Historical Society
Historians from Northern Ireland
Reformation historians
Boston University faculty
Academic staff of Queen's University at Kingston
Queen's University at Kingston alumni
Alumni of the University of St Andrews
Male non-fiction writers from Northern Ireland
Members of the Royal Irish Academy
Living people
1952 births